Robin Mattson is an American actress. She is best known for her roles on the daytime soap operas General Hospital, Santa Barbara, and All My Children.

Career

Daytime television
Mattson made her daytime debut as troubled teen Hope Bauer on Guiding Light in 1976, her only complete heroine on the soaps. She received a Soap Opera Digest Award and an Emmy Award nomination for her first major role as Heather Webber on General Hospital. During Ilene Kristen's absence from Ryan's Hope, she played Delia Ryan (1984). Replacing Linda Gibboney on Santa Barbara, she received additional Emmy nominations as Gina Blake Lockridge, a role she played from December 1985 through the final episode in January 1993. Mattson then moved to New York to play Janet Green on All My Children (1994–2000). Over the next few years, she took on several short term roles on The Bold and the Beautiful (2003), Madame Cheri Love on As the World Turns (2007), and Lee Michaels on Days of Our Lives (2010–11). Mattson returned to General Hospital on two occasions, first in 2004 for six months, where she was reunited with her former Santa Barbara co-star Jed Allan, and in the spring of 2012. Mattson has continued to play the role for storyline arcs of varying lengths as the plotline dictated. Mattson would exit in early 2015 but returned once again in May 2016.

Film and primetime television
Mattson began acting at age seven.

She made her screen debut in Namu, the Killer Whale (1966). She co-starred in Bonnie's Kids (1973) when she was only 15, including appearing topless, as well as Candy Stripe Nurses (1974) and Return to Macon County (1975). She appeared in a number of made for television films and guest starred in a number of primetime series, include Marcus Welby, M.D., Happy Days, Barnaby Jones, Charlie's Angels, The Dukes of Hazzard and Law & Order.

Personal life
Mattson, whose father was a chef in California, studied at culinary school and co-authored the cook book Soap Opera Café : The Skinny on Food from a Daytime Star. And from June 1996 until March 1997, she had a cooking show on Lifetime, called The Main Ingredient.

Filmography

Film

Television

References

External links

"Oops! — California Digital Newspaper Collection." Oops! — California Digital Newspaper Collection. Consair- California Digital Newspaper. Web. 1 June 2016.

Living people
Actresses from Los Angeles
American film actresses
American soap opera actresses
American television actresses
20th-century American actresses
21st-century American actresses
Year of birth missing (living people)